Abdul Rasaq Ishiekwene Akeem (born 16 June 2001), commonly known as Rasaq Akeem, is a Singaporean-Nigerian footballer currently playing as a midfielder for Young Lions.

Career statistics

Club

Notes

International statistics

U22 International caps

U19 International caps

References

External links

 Rasaq Akeem Interview

Living people
2001 births
Singaporean footballers
Nigerian footballers
Association football midfielders
Singapore Premier League players
Young Lions FC players
Singapore youth international footballers